The Yemeni Coast Guard is the coast guard service of Yemen and was founded in 2003. It has constabulary and navigation role in Yemen's ports and regional waters, as the country has  of coastline. Since the start of the Yemeni civil war in 2015, the Coast Guard functions under the internationally recognised government backed by the Saudi Arabian-led coalition. Several ports and coastal facilities in areas controlled by the Saudi-backed government of Yemen are under the authority of the Yemeni Coast Guard, which has its headquarters in Mukalla.

Role and organisation
The Coast Guard's duties include countering smuggling, illegal immigration, and piracy.
The Yemen Post reports that Yemeni Coast Guard forces have engaged in combat with corrupt elements of other Yemeni security organs. According to the Wall Street Journal shipping firms can hire US trained Yemeni Coast Guard personnel to help guard their vessels during their transit of Yemeni waters.

Since the start of the Saudi intervention in Yemen in 2015, the Coast Guard has cooperated with the naval forces section of the Joint Forces Command. The Coast Guard's area of responsibility is divided into sectors based on the country's governorates.

Ships
Some of its fleet were formerly United States Coast Guard vessels, or were built to the same design as USCG vessels. Since 2015, the Coast Guard also includes boats and equipment provided by Saudi Arabia, which gave Yemen 37 boats.

Incidents
On 13 March 2017, two people were killed when a Coast Guard ship was struck by a mine that was left by Houthi forces.

See also
 Sanaa (patrol vessel)

References

Coast guards
Law enforcement in Yemen
Organizations established in 2003
Military of Yemen
2003 establishments in Yemen